Willumsen is a surname. Notable people with the surname include: 

Charles Willumsen (1918–1984), Danish rower
Dorrit Willumsen (born 1940), Danish writer
Jens Ferdinand Willumsen (1863–1958), Danish artist, architect and photographer
Willumsens Museum, in Frederikssund, Denmark
Mary Willumsen (1884–1961), Danish photographer

Danish-language surnames